Public holidays in Somalia are based on two official calendar systems: the Gregorian calendar primarily, and the Islamic lunar calendar for religious holidays.

See also
Public holidays in Djibouti

References

Somali culture
Events in Somalia
Somalia
Holidays
Somalia